Rear Admiral Arthur David Torlesse,  (24 January 1902 – 19 July 1995) was a Royal Navy  officer. He commanded the escort carrier  during the latter part of the Second World War, and the aircraft carrier  during the early months of the Korean War. In 1952, he commanded the task force that supported Operation Hurricane, the first British nuclear weapons test.

Early life and career
Arthur David Torlesse was born in Bognor Regis in West Sussex on 24 January 1902, the son of a Royal Navy officer, Captain Arthur Ward Torlesse, and his wife Harriet Mary (née Jeans). He had a brother, Ynyr John Torlesse. He was educated at Park High School, Stanmore, Royal Naval College, Osborne, which he entered in 1915, and Royal Naval College, Dartmouth. He served as a midshipman with the Grand Fleet during the First World War.

He was promoted to lieutenant on 15 June 1923. He joined the crew of the aircraft carrier  on 28 May 1925, and qualified as an air observer with the Fleet Air Arm. He married Sheila Mary Susan Darroch, the daughter of Lieutenant Colonel Duncan Darroch, 6th of Gourock, a retired Army officer of the Argyll and Sutherland Highlanders, on 29 April 1933. They two sons, Charles David and Anthony John, and a daughter, Susan.

After attending the staff course at the Royal Naval College, Greenwich, Torlesse became operations officer on the staff of the Commander-in-Chief, Home Fleet, on the battleship  in July 1935. He was promoted to commander on 31 December. After attending a tactical course at HM Dockyard, Portsmouth, in 1936, he was served on the battlecruiser . This was followed by a posting to the Far East as the operations officer on the staff of Commodore, Malaya, based at the  Singapore Naval Base, and for a time he was also the Naval Attaché to Thailand in Bangkok.

Second World War
Returning to Britain, Torlesse became executive officer of the cruiser  on 6 July 1939. He joined the staff of Rear Admiral, Naval Air Stations at HMNS Daedalus (also known as RNAS Lee-on-Solent) on 8 July 1940. On 12 January 1942, he became an Assistant Director of Naval Air Division at the Admiralty. He was promoted to captain on 30 June. On 1 February 1943, he became the Deputy Director of Naval Air Warfare and Flying Training Division at the Admiralty.

Torlesse's first command came on 10 November 1944, when he became captain of the escort carrier , which became part of the Eastern Fleet. Hunter supported Operation Dracula, the amphibious attack on Rangoon, and, after the war ended, Operation Zipper, the reoccupation of Singapore. Hunter was present in Singapore for the Japanese surrender before returning to Britain in October 1945, and being returned to the United States Navy on 29 December. For his services, Torlesse was made a Companion of the Distinguished Service Order on 28 December.

Korea

Torlesse returned to the Admiralty, where he became Director of the Airfields and Carrier Requirements Department on 1 March 1946, and then Director of the Air Equipment Department on 17 May 1948. On 7 December 1949, he became captain of the aircraft carrier , which saw active service in the early months of the Korean War, including supporting Operation Chromite, the American landings at Incheon. Torlesse was mentioned in despatches on 30 January 1951, and was made an Officer of the American Legion of Merit on 13 August 1954.

Operation Hurricane and after
Promoted to rear admiral on 7 July 1951, Torlesse was placed in change of a small fleet assembled for Operation Hurricane, the first test of a British atomic bomb. His command included the escort carrier , which served as his flagship, the LSTs Narvik, Zeebrugge and Tracker, and the River-class frigate , which would act as a target ship. The bomb was assembled at Foulness, and then taken to Plym on 5 June 1952 for transport to the Monte Bello Islands in Australia, where the test would take place. It took Campania and Plym eight weeks to make the voyage, as for security reasons they sailed around the Cape of Good Hope instead of traversing the Suez Canal. The Monte Bello Islands were reached on 8 August.

The bomb was successfully detonated on board Plym on 3 October 1952. For his part, Torlesse was made a Companion of the Order of the Bath on 30 December. His final posting was as Flag Officer, Ground Training. He retired on 16 December 1954. He served for a time as a regional director of civil defence.

Torlesse died in Lymington, Hampshire, on 19 July 1995.

Notes

References

 

1902 births
1995 deaths
Military personnel from Sussex
Graduates of the Royal Naval College, Greenwich
People educated at the Royal Naval College, Osborne
Graduates of Britannia Royal Naval College
Companions of the Distinguished Service Order
Companions of the Order of the Bath
Officers of the Legion of Merit
People from Bognor Regis
Royal Navy rear admirals
Royal Navy personnel of World War II
Royal Navy personnel of the Korean War
Royal Navy personnel of World War I
Fleet Air Arm personnel of World War II